Jeannettes Creek is a community in Chatham-Kent, Ontario, Canada.  It is located approximately 6 kms north of Tilbury.

Communities in Chatham-Kent